Mangifera andamanica belongs to the family Anacardiaceae and is endemic to the Andaman Islands in the Bay of Bengal. The fruits are edible and smaller than the Common Mango. This species is conserved at the Field Gene bank of Jawaharlal Neheru Tropical Botanic Garden and research Institute, Thiruvananthapuram, India.

References

andamanica
Flora of the Andaman Islands
Endangered plants
Taxonomy articles created by Polbot